The  2018 Winter Olympics was held in Pyeongchang County, South Korea, between 9–25 February 2018. The games featured 102 events in 15 sports, making it the first Winter Olympics to surpass 100 medal events. Four new disciplines in existing sports were introduced to the Winter Olympic programme in Pyeongchang, including big air snowboarding, mixed doubles curling, mass start speed skating, and mixed team alpine skiing.

{| id="toc" class="toc" summary="Contents"
|align="center" colspan="3"|Contents
|-
|
Alpine skiing
Biathlon
Bobsleigh
Cross-country skiing
Curling
|valign=top|
Figure skating
Freestyle skiing
Ice hockey
Luge
Nordic combined
|valign=top|
Short track speed skating
Skeleton
Ski jumping
Snowboarding
Speed skating
|-
|align=center colspan=3|See also   References
|}


Alpine skiing

Men's events

Women's events

Mixed events

Biathlon

Men's events

Women's events

Mixed events

Bobsleigh

Cross-country skiing

Men's events

Women's events

Curling

Figure skating

Freestyle skiing

Men's events

Women's events

Ice hockey

Luge

Nordic combined

Short track speed skating

Men's events

Women's events

Skeleton

Ski jumping

Snowboarding

Men's events

Women's events

Speed skating

Men's events

Women's events

See also
 2018 Winter Olympics medal table

References

External links

Medal winners
Lists of Winter Olympic medalists by year
South Korea sport-related lists